

Gmina Otmuchów is an urban-rural gmina (administrative district) in Nysa County, Opole Voivodeship, in south-western Poland, on the Czech border.

Villages
Apart from the town of Otmuchów, Gmina Otmuchów contains the villages and settlements of Broniszowice, Buków, Goraszowice, Grądy, Janowa, Jarnołtów, Jasienica Górna, Jodłów, Kałków, Kamienna Góra, Kijów, Kwiatków, Łąka, Laskowice, Lasowice, Ligota Wielka, Lubiatów, Maciejowice, Malerzowice Małe, Meszno, Nadziejów, Nieradowice, Pasieki, Piotrowice Nyskie, Ratnowice, Rysiowice, Sarnowice, Siedlec, Śliwice, Starowice, Suszkowice, Ulanowice, Wierzbno, Wójcice and Zwanowice.

Neighbouring gminas
Gmina Otmuchów is bordered by the gminas of Głuchołazy, Kamiennik, Nysa, Paczków, Pakosławice and Ziębice. It also borders the Czech Republic.

Twin towns – sister cities

Gmina Otmuchów is twinned with:

 Bernkastel-Kues, Germany
 La Bourboule, France
 Javorník, Czech Republic
 Lopatyn, Ukraine
 Milo, Italy
 Varsány, Hungary

References

Otmuchow
Nysa County